"Christianity or Europe" (also known simply as "Europa") is a pamphlet written by the German writer Novalis between October and November 1799. Novalis wrote the pamphlet to present to his Romantic contemporaries in Jena.

The pamphlet discusses the future of the European continent, which seemed unstable given the recent rise of Napoleon and the death of Pope Pius VI in 1799. Novalis reminisces on the perceived glory of pre-Reformation Europe and advocates a greater political union between European states based on religion to bring Europe back to its former glory.

Summary 
In 1799, Europe was in a precarious situation, as war with France seemed likely, and the Catholic Church was without a leader. Novalis believed that these conditions created an opportunity for a new, better era to begin. He saw the potential for Europe's regeneration through a renewal of the Catholic church and a greater unity between European states.

Novalis describes the beauty of the "primeval age" (early mediaeval Christianity) which was followed by an intermediate phase of decay. This intermediate phase will, in Novalis' eyes, be followed by a restoration of the primeval age, but on a higher level. Novalis saw Europe at a possible transition from the intermediate to golden age at the time of his writing.

At the end of the pamphlet, the author invites the reader to try and use this momentary threshold point to help reach the utopian final stage.

Legacy 
"Christianity or Europe" was controversial within Novalis' Jena circle. Some, such as Friedrich Schlegel, thought that the text should be published, but Goethe disagreed when he was asked for advice.

After Novalis' early death in 1801, the text remained unpublished in its entirety until 1826, when it was published by Georg Reimer.

References

Sources

External links 
The full text at Zeno.org (in German)

Works by Novalis
History of European integration
Pamphlets